The 1957 World Table Tennis Championships women's singles was the 24th edition of the women's singles championship.
Fujie Eguchi defeated Ann Haydon in the final by three sets to two, to win the title.

Seeds

  Tomi Okawa
  Angelica Rozeanu
  Fujie Eguchi
  Ann Haydon
  Gizi Farkas
  Kiiko Watanabe
  Ella Zeller
  Éva Kóczián
  Ermelinde Wertl
  Diane Rowe
  Yoshio Tanaka
  Helen Elliot
  Christiane Watel

Results

See also
List of World Table Tennis Championships medalists

References

-
1957 in women's table tennis